is a train station in Kushima, Miyazaki Prefecture, Japan.

Lines

Layout 
The station consists of a side platform serving a single track at grade in a residential area. There is no station building, only a simple modern shed which serves as a waiting room. A bike shed has been set up at the station forecourt. From there, a short flight of steps leads up to the waiting room and platform.

Adjacent stations

History
The line was then extended northwards in phases. The first major phase of expansion added 28.5 km of track and several stations, reaching Yowara, which opened as the new northern terminus on 15 April 1935. Hyūga-Kitakata was one of the intermediate stations which opened on the same day. On 8 May 1963, the route was designated the Nichinan Line. With the privatization of Japanese National Railways (JNR), the successor of JGR, on 1 April 1987, the station came under the control of JR Kyushu.

Passenger statistics
In fiscal 2016, the station was used by an average of 12 passengers (boarding only) per day.

See also
List of railway stations in Japan

References

External links
Hyūga-Kitakata (JR Kyushu)

Railway stations in Miyazaki Prefecture
Railway stations in Japan opened in 1935